Haliacmon (or Aliacmon,) was in Greek mythology a son of Oceanus and Thetys. He was a minor river god in his own right, of the eponymous Haliacmon in Macedonia.  In other mythological traditions he was the son of Palaestinus and grandson of Poseidon.

References

Greek sea gods
Mythology of Macedonia (region)